Chester Center is a census-designated place (CDP) comprising the primary village in the town of Chester, Middlesex County, Connecticut, United States. It is in the southeast corner of the town, bordered to the south by the town of Deep River and to the southwest largely by the Connecticut Route 9 freeway. As of the 2020 census, Chester Center had a population of 1,720, out of 3,749 in the entire town of Chester.

References 

Census-designated places in Middlesex County, Connecticut
Census-designated places in Connecticut